The World Heritage Convention, formally the Convention Concerning the Protection of the World Cultural and Natural Heritage, is an international treaty signed on 23 November 1972, which created the World Heritage Sites, with the primary goals of nature conservation and the preservation of cultural properties. The convention, a signed document of international agreement, guides the work of the World Heritage Committee. It was developed over a seven-year period (1965–1972).

The convention defines which sites which can be considered for inscription on the World Heritage List, sets out the duties of each country's governments to identify potential sites and to protect and preserve them. Signatory countries pledge to conserve the World Heritage sites situated on their territory, and report regularly on the state of their conservation. The convention also sets out how the World Heritage Fund is to be used and managed.

It was adopted by the General Conference of UNESCO on 16 November 1972, and signed by the President of General Conference of UNESCO, Toru Haguiwara, and the Director-General of UNESCO, René Maheu, on 23 November 1972. It is held in the archives of UNESCO.

Development
The International Campaign to Save the Monuments of Nubia, begun after appeals by Egypt and Sudan in 1959, led to the relocation of 22 monuments. The success of the project, in particular the creation of a coalition of 50 countries behind the project, led UNESCO, together with the International Council on Monuments and Sites (ICOMOS), to prepare a draft convention on the protection of cultural heritage.

A White House conference in 1965 called for a "World Heritage Trust" to preserve "the world's superb natural and scenic areas and historic sites for the present and the future of the entire world citizenry". The International Union for Conservation of Nature developed similar proposals in 1968, which were presented in 1972 to the United Nations Conference on the Human Environment in Stockholm. Under the World Heritage Committee, signatory countries are required to produce and submit periodic data reporting providing the committee with an overview of each participating nation's implementation of the World Heritage Convention and a 'snapshot' of current conditions at World Heritage properties.

Adoption and implementation

Based on the draft convention that UNESCO had initiated, a single text was eventually agreed upon by all parties, and the "Convention Concerning the Protection of the World Cultural and Natural Heritage" was adopted by the General Conference of UNESCO on 16 November 1972. The convention came into force on 17 December 1975, three months after the 20th ratification.

The convention began to be implemented in 1977, after the 40th ratification, and the first names were inscribed to the list in 1978. New names have been added to the list every year since then, at the annual sessions of the World Heritage Committee.

Contents
The convention contains 38 articles. The key articles are set out below:

Ratification
As of March 2022, the convention has been ratified by 194 states: 190 UN member states, 2 UN observer states (the Holy See and the State of Palestine), and 2 states in free association with New Zealand (the Cook Islands and Niue). Only three UN member states have not ratified the convention: Liechtenstein, Nauru, and Tuvalu.

Bibliography
 
 
 Meskell, Lynn. “States of Conservation: Protection, Politics, and Pacting within UNESCO’s World Heritage Committee.” Anthropological Quarterly, vol. 87, no. 1, 2014, pp. 217–43. JSTOR, http://www.jstor.org/stable/43652726. Accessed 12 October 2022.

References

United Nations treaties
Treaties concluded in 1972
Treaties of the Islamic State of Afghanistan
Treaties of Albania
Treaties of Algeria
Treaties of Andorra
Treaties of the People's Republic of Angola
Treaties of Antigua and Barbuda
Treaties of Argentina
Treaties of Armenia
Treaties of Australia
Treaties of Austria
Treaties of Azerbaijan
Treaties of the Bahamas
Treaties of Bahrain
Treaties of Bangladesh
Treaties of Barbados
Treaties of the Byelorussian Soviet Socialist Republic
Treaties of Belgium
Treaties of Belize
Treaties of Benin
Treaties of Bhutan
Treaties of Bolivia
Treaties of Bosnia and Herzegovina
Treaties of Botswana
Treaties of Brazil
Treaties of Brunei
Treaties of Bulgaria
Treaties of Burkina Faso
Treaties of Myanmar
Treaties of Burundi
Treaties of the State of Cambodia
Treaties of Cameroon
Treaties of Canada
Treaties of Cape Verde
Treaties of the Central African Republic
Treaties of Chad
Treaties of Chile
Treaties of the People's Republic of China
Treaties of Colombia
Treaties of the Comoros
Treaties of Zaire
Treaties of the Republic of the Congo
Treaties of the Cook Islands
Treaties of Costa Rica
Treaties of Ivory Coast
Treaties of Croatia
Treaties of Cuba
Treaties of Cyprus
Treaties of the Czech Republic
Treaties of Denmark
Treaties of Djibouti
Treaties of Dominica
Treaties of the Dominican Republic
Treaties of East Timor
Treaties of Ecuador
Treaties of Egypt
Treaties of El Salvador
Treaties of Equatorial Guinea
Treaties of Eritrea
Treaties of Estonia
Treaties of the People's Democratic Republic of Ethiopia
Treaties of Fiji
Treaties of Finland
Treaties of France
Treaties of Gabon
Treaties of the Gambia
Treaties of Georgia (country)
Treaties of Germany
Treaties of Ghana
Treaties of Greece
Treaties of Grenada
Treaties of Guatemala
Treaties of Guinea
Treaties of Guinea-Bissau
Treaties of Haiti
Treaties of Honduras
Treaties of Hungary
Treaties of Iceland
Treaties of India
Treaties of Indonesia
Treaties of Iran
Treaties of Ba'athist Iraq
Treaties of Ireland
Treaties of Israel
Treaties of Italy
Treaties of Jamaica
Treaties of Japan
Treaties of Jordan
Treaties of Kazakhstan
Treaties of Kenya
Treaties of Kiribati
Treaties of North Korea
Treaties of South Korea
Treaties of Kuwait
Treaties of Kyrgyzstan
Treaties of Laos
Treaties of Latvia
Treaties of Lebanon
Treaties of Lesotho
Treaties of Liberia
Treaties of the Libyan Arab Jamahiriya
Treaties of Liechtenstein
Treaties of Lithuania
Treaties of Luxembourg
Treaties of North Macedonia
Treaties of Madagascar
Treaties of Malawi
Treaties of Malaysia
Treaties of the Maldives
Treaties of Mali
Treaties of Malta
Treaties of the Marshall Islands
Treaties of Mauritania
Treaties of Mauritius
Treaties of Mexico
Treaties of the Federated States of Micronesia
Treaties of Moldova
Treaties of Monaco
Treaties of the Mongolian People's Republic
Treaties of Montenegro
Treaties of Morocco
Treaties of Mozambique
Treaties of Namibia
Treaties of Nauru
Treaties of Nepal
Treaties of the Netherlands
Treaties of New Zealand
Treaties of Nicaragua
Treaties of Niue
Treaties of Niger
Treaties of Nigeria
Treaties of Norway
Treaties of Oman
Treaties of Pakistan
Treaties of Palau
Treaties of the State of Palestine
Treaties of Panama
Treaties of Papua New Guinea
Treaties of Paraguay
Treaties of Peru
Treaties of the Philippines
Treaties of Poland
Treaties of Portugal
Treaties of Qatar
Treaties of Romania
Treaties of the Soviet Union
Treaties of Rwanda
Treaties of Saint Kitts and Nevis
Treaties of Saint Lucia
Treaties of Saint Vincent and the Grenadines
Treaties of Samoa
Treaties of San Marino
Treaties of São Tomé and Príncipe
Treaties of Saudi Arabia
Treaties of Senegal
Treaties of Serbia and Montenegro
Treaties of Seychelles
Treaties of Sierra Leone
Treaties of Singapore
Treaties of Slovakia
Treaties of Slovenia
Treaties of the Solomon Islands
Treaties of Somalia
Treaties of South Africa
Treaties of South Sudan
Treaties of Spain
Treaties of Sri Lanka
Treaties of the Republic of the Sudan (1985–2011)
Treaties of Suriname
Treaties of Eswatini
Treaties of Sweden
Treaties of Switzerland
Treaties of Syria
Treaties of Tajikistan
Treaties of Thailand
Treaties of Togo
Treaties of Tonga
Treaties of Trinidad and Tobago
Treaties of Tunisia
Treaties of Turkey
Treaties of Turkmenistan
Treaties of Tuvalu
Treaties of Uganda
Treaties of Ukraine
Treaties of the United Arab Emirates
Treaties of the United Kingdom
Treaties of the United States
Treaties of Uruguay
Treaties of Uzbekistan
Treaties of Vanuatu
Treaties of Venezuela
Treaties of Vietnam
Treaties of Yemen
Treaties of Zambia
Treaties of Zimbabwe
Treaties of Czechoslovakia
Treaties of East Germany
Treaties of the Holy See
Treaties of Yugoslavia
Treaties adopted by United Nations General Assembly resolutions
Treaties extended to Anguilla
Treaties extended to Bermuda
Treaties extended to the British Virgin Islands
Treaties extended to the Cayman Islands
Treaties extended to the Falkland Islands
Treaties extended to the Isle of Man
Treaties extended to Montserrat
Treaties extended to the Pitcairn Islands
Treaties extended to Saint Helena, Ascension and Tristan da Cunha
Treaties extended to South Georgia and the South Sandwich Islands
Treaties extended to the Turks and Caicos Islands
Treaties extended to the Netherlands Antilles
Treaties extended to Aruba
Treaties extended to the Faroe Islands
Treaties extended to Greenland
Treaties extended to British Hong Kong
Treaties extended to Portuguese Macau
Treaties extended to Jersey
November 1972 events